CJKX-FM is a Canadian radio station. Although its official city of licence is Ajax, Ontario, the station operates from studios in Oshawa, Ontario with co-owned stations CKDO and CKGE-FM. Airing at 95.9 FM, the station broadcasts a country format branded as KX96.

History
The station was launched on November 21, 1967 as AM 1390 CHOO. The station was acquired in 1973 by Community Communications, and in 1977 by Golden West Broadcasting. In 1994, the station was acquired by its current owner, Durham Radio, and moved to its current FM frequency.

In 1999, the station added a 5 kW rebroadcaster (CJKX-FM-1) in Sunderland, operating on 89.9 FM to cover the area that receives interference from first-adjacent CFJB-FM.

In 2006, CJKX was approved by the Canadian Radio-television and Telecommunications Commission to add a rebroadcaster (CJKX-FM-2) in downtown Toronto, to operate on 95.9 FM, the same frequency as the main station. That rebroadcaster's transmitter is located atop the First Canadian Place.

The CHOO callsign was formerly used at a station, (now defunct) in Tofino, British Columbia from 2000 to 2002. The current "CHOO" callsign is now currently being used at a radio station Drumheller, Alberta, known today as CHOO-FM. Both of these stations that used the "CHOO" callsign have no relation to CJKX.

On August 1, 2016, the CRTC denied Durham Radio Inc. (Durham)'s application to change the authorized contours of CJKX-FM-2. The applicant proposed to change the transmitter's class from A to B1 and increase the average effective radiated power (ERP) from 122 to 194 watts (maximum ERP from 220 to 800 watts).

References

External links
 KX96
 

Ajax, Ontario
Jkx
Jkx
Radio stations established in 1967
1967 establishments in Ontario